Canterbury Golf Club is a private golf and country club located in the Cleveland suburb of Beachwood, Ohio, US.  The club was formerly the home of the DAP Championship, part of the Web.com Tour Finals.

A member club of the USGA, Canterbury has been recognized by Golf Digest as one of the top 100 courses in the United States.  The club has hosted the U.S. Open and the PGA Championship, as well as the U.S. Senior Open, the Senior PGA Championship, and the U.S. Amateur.

History
The property lays primarily in Beachwood and, at its northernmost tip, in Shaker Heights. The site was chosen for its high elevation, rolling hills, brooks, and wooded areas.

Designed by architect Herbert Strong, development of the course began in 1921.  The first nine holes were opened on July 1, 1922.  The second nine were completed shortly thereafter.  The course was later enlarged and reconstructed, in 1928, by W. H. Way.

The club is named for Canterbury, Connecticut, the birthplace of Cleveland's founder, General Moses Cleaveland.  Female members were first admitted in 1923.

Yardage and ratings

Notable facts
Canterbury is the second club to host all five of the men's rotating major championships, played within the United States: the U.S. Open, the U.S Senior Open, the PGA Championship, the Senior PGA Championship, and the U.S. Amateur.  (Oak Hill C.C. completed the set of five in 2008, one year before Canterbury did so.)
Canterbury was the site of Jack Nicklaus' 12th major professional victory, the 1973 PGA Championship.  With this victory and his two U.S. Amateur championships, Nicklaus surpassed Bobby Jones' career record of 13 professional/amateur majors.
The competitive course record is 66, held by six players: Al Geiberger, Lee Trevino, Don Iverson, Denny Lyons, and Buddy Allin (all at the 1973 PGA Championship) and Bobby Clampett (at the 1979 U.S. Amateur).
In 2009 at Canterbury, Michael Allen became the second man, after Arnold Palmer, to debut on the Senior (champions) Tour by winning the Senior PGA Championship.
At 608 yards, Canterbury's sixteenth hole and the seventh at Brooklawn C.C. are the longest Par 5 holes ever played at a U.S. Senior Open
Canterbury hosted the first four Senior Tournament Players Championships, 1983–86.

Major tournaments hosted
Canterbury has been the site of 13 major championships at the professional, senior professional, and amateur levels.  Modern day majors of the PGA Tour are highlighted.

a – Unofficial major.
b – Guldahl defeated Horton Smith in a playoff.
c – Little defeated Gene Sarazen by 3 strokes in an 18-hole playoff.  Ed Oliver was also tied with Little and Sarazen at the end of regulation play, but was disqualified from the playoff for having started the fourth round early so as to avoid a coming storm.
d – Mangrum remained tied with Byron Nelson and Vic Ghezzi after an 18-hole playoff, then defeated both by 1 stroke in a second 18-hole playoff.
u – Unknown.

References

External links
Canterbury Golf Club
Professional Golfers Association of America (PGA of America)
The Encyclopedia of Cleveland History
United States Golf Association (USGA)

1921 establishments in Ohio
Buildings and structures in Cuyahoga County, Ohio
Beachwood, Ohio
Golf clubs and courses in Ohio
Sports in Cuyahoga County, Ohio
Sports venues completed in 1921
Tourist attractions in Cuyahoga County, Ohio
Shaker Heights, Ohio